Vallée-de-Ronsard (literally Valley of Ronsard) is a commune in the Loir-et-Cher department of central France. It was established on 1 January 2019 by merger of the former communes of Couture-sur-Loir (the seat) and Tréhet.

See also
Communes of the Loir-et-Cher department

References

Communes of Loir-et-Cher